Haikou Transportation Center, also known as Haikou Bus terminal, is the main bus station serving Haikou, Hainan, China. It is located across the road from Haikou East railway station's south side. It was built during 2017 and opened in October of that year. The main bus station was once called Haikou South Station, and was located on Nanhai Road around 1.5 km northwest of Haikou East railway station.

The site covers an area of about 60,000 square meters and has a capacity of about 20,000 people per day.

Interior

There are numerous automatic ticket machines as well as a wicket in the ticket hall. The security checkpoint to enter the bus area has an x-ray machine. The second floor has several restaurants.

References

External links
 Image from Haikou.hinews.cn

Buildings and structures in Haikou
Bus stations in China